The United Nations Educational, Scientific and Cultural Organization (UNESCO) World Heritage Sites are places of importance to cultural or natural heritage as described in the UNESCO World Heritage Convention, established in 1972. Chile accepted the convention on 20 February 1980 and currently has 6 sites listed. , an additional 17 properties have been placed on the tentative list for possible future inclusion on the World Heritage List: 15 cultural sites and two natural sites.
Chile had its first site included on the list at the 19th session of World Heritage Committee, held in Germany, 1995. At that session, the Rapa Nui National Park was inscribed on the list.

World Heritage Sites 

Name: as listed by the World Heritage Committee
Location: Region and Province where the site is located. If the site is a trans-border site the other countries will be listed in a note.
Coordinates: geographic coordinates of the site's location
Date of Inscription: Year and session the site was added to the World Heritage List
Criteria: The criteria it was listed under: criteria (i) through (vi) are cultural, while (vii) through (x) are natural
Description: brief description of the site as listed by the World Heritage Committee
ID: Reference number given by UNESCO

Tentative List 

In addition to the sites inscribed on the World Heritage list, member states can maintain a list of tentative sites that they may consider for nomination. Nominations for the World Heritage list are only accepted if the site was previously listed on the tentative list. As of 2017, Chile recorded 17 sites on its tentative list.

Name: as listed by the World Heritage Committee
Location: Regions and Province where is located and geographic coordinates of the site
Date of submission: Date the site was submitted to the Tentative List
Criteria: The criteria it was listed under: criteria (i) through (vi) are cultural, while (vii) through (x) are natural
Description: brief description of the site
ID: Reference number given by UNESCO

Intangible Cultural Heritage

See also 
 Table of World Heritage Sites by country
 List of World Heritage Sites by year of inscription
 List of World Heritage Sites in South America

References and notes

External links 

 Chile at UNESCO World Heritage Convention

Chile
World Heritage Sites